Meshchera is an extinct Uralic language. It was spoken around the left bank of the Middle Oka. Meshchera was either a Mordvinic or a Permic language. Pauli Rahkonen has suggested on the basis of toponymic evidence that it was a Permic or closely related language. Rahkonen's speculation has been criticized by Vladimir Napolskikh.  Some Meshchera speaking people possibly assimilated into Mishar Tatars. However this theory is disputed.

The first Russian written source which mentions them is the Tolkovaya Paleya, from the 13th century. They are also mentioned in several later Russian chronicles from the period before the 16th century, and even later, in one of the letters by Andrey Kurbsky written in the second half of the 16th century, where he claimed the language spoken in the Meshchera region to be Mordvinic.

Reconstruction 
Some words have been reconstructed from Meshchera based on toponymic data, for example: Meshchera hydronymic stems un-, ič-, vil- and ul, which can be compared to Udmurt uno 'big', iči 'little', vi̮l 'upper' and ulo 'lower'.

See also 
 Meryans
 Meryan language
 Volga Finns

References 

Extinct languages of Europe
Uralic languages
Medieval languages